Jus2 is a South Korean duo consisting of Jay B and Yugyeom. They were formed by JYP Entertainment and released their first EP, Focus, on March 5, 2019. It is the second Got7 sub unit, after JJ Project.

Name
The duo's name is "a combination of the words just and two" according to member Yugyeom.

History
On February 13, 2019, JYP Entertainment announced the formation of a new Got7 unit which would debut sometime in March. It was later revealed that their debut EP, Focus, would be released on March 5 and would contain six tracks with "Focus On Me" as the title track. The music video for the lead song was released on March 3. The duo held their debut stage on Mnet's M Countdown on March 7, 2019. Focus debuted at number 6 on Billboard World Album Chart.

They released an OST for He is Psychometric, called "Take".

On January 19, 2021, following the expiration of their contract, they left JYP Entertainment.

Discography

Extended plays

Singles

Soundtrack appearances

Tours and concerts
 Jus2 <FOCUS> Live Premiere with V Live
 Jus2 <FOCUS> Premiere Showcase Tour

Tour dates

Filmography

Variety shows

Music videos

See also
 Got7 discography
 List of awards and nominations received by Got7

References

External links
  

JYP Entertainment artists
K-pop music groups
Male musical duos
Musical groups established in 2019
Musical groups from Seoul
South Korean boy bands
South Korean dance music groups
South Korean musical duos
2019 establishments in South Korea